
Year 27 BC was either a common year starting on Sunday, Monday or Tuesday or a leap year starting on Monday (link will display the full calendar) of the Julian calendar (the sources differ, see leap year error for further information) and a common year starting on Sunday of the Proleptic Julian calendar. At the time, it was known as the Year of the Second Consulship of Octavian and Agrippa (or, less frequently, year 727 Ab urbe condita). The denomination 27 BC for this year has been used since the early medieval period, when the Anno Domini calendar era became the prevalent method in Europe for naming years.

Events 
 By place 

 Roman Republic/Empire 
 Gaius Julius Caesar Octavian becomes Roman Consul for the seventh time. His partner Marcus Vipsanius Agrippa becomes Consul for the third time.
 January 16 – Octavian formally returns full power to the Senate; they give him the titles of Princeps and Augustus. He accepts this honor, having declined the alternative title of Romulus, thus becoming first Roman emperor.
 Caesar Augustus starts a new military reform. He reduces the number of legions to 26 and creates the Praetorian Guard (1,000 men).
 Augustus forms the Classis Misenensis, based in the harbor of Portus Julius at Misenum.
 Agrippa divides Hispania Ulterior into Baetica and Lusitania, and enlarges Hispania Citerior.
 Northern statue of the Colossi of Memnon is shattered by an earthquake in Egypt (according to Strabo).
 Marcus Agrippa begins the construction of the old Pantheon, Rome.
 Augustus' first census of the Roman Empire (formerly the Roman Republic) reports a total of 4,063,000 citizens.

Births 
 Ai of Han, Chinese emperor of the Han Dynasty (d. 1 BC)

Deaths 
 Marcus Terentius Varro, Roman scholar and writer (b. 116 BC)

References